The coat of arms of Sofia consists of a shield divided into four. The image of the Saint Sofia Church which gave the name to the city takes up the upper left quarter (as seen from behind the shield) and a humanized picture of the ancient town of Serdica taken from an antique coin is located to the right (again, heraldry reverses right and left as it is from the point of view of someone holding the shield from behind). At lower left is a golden baldachin and a statue of Apollo Medicus representing the mineral springs around the city, while the lower right quarter is reserved for Vitosha, the mountain at the foot of which Sofia is located. 

In the middle is another, smaller shield (inescutcheon), with a lion rampant, a traditional Bulgarian symbol. A mural crown tops the larger shield. At the bottom is the city motto, "Расте, но не старѣе" – Raste, no ne staree ("Ever Growing, Never Aging").

History
The coat of arms was created for the Paris Exposition Universelle in 1900 by a team of three noted Bulgarian artists and specialists – Haralampi Tachev, Ivan Mrkvička and Václav Dobruský, as the city was required by the executive committee to submit a symbol in order to take part. The then-Knyaz Ferdinand approved the coat of arms and it was sent to Paris.

Changes were made to the original image of the coat of arms in the following years. The motto was first added in 1911 by Haralampi Tachev, who also gave it a final touch by adding a band with the motto and laurel twigs in 1928. A simplified version was suggested by Boris Angelushev in the 1940s, with Ivan Radoev adding a five-pointed star and additionally stylizing the coat of arms in 1974. The 1928 edition of Haralampi Tachev returned into official use after the democratic changes.

Gallery

References

External links
 The act restoring the original coat of arms in 1991
 The Birth of the Coat of Arms, excerpt from a publication by Haralampi Tachev. Sofia municipal website, accessed 5 April 2006.

1928 establishments in Bulgaria
Sofia
Culture in Sofia
History of Sofia
Sofia
Sofia
Sofia